Bendix may refer to:

People

First name
 Bendix Hallenstein (1835–1905), New Zealand businessman

Middle name
 Kim Bendix Petersen (born 1956), Danish singer known by the stage name King Diamond

Last name
 John E. Bendix (1835–1905), American Civil War and New York Guard general
 Max Bendix (1866–1945), American composer, conductor, violinist
 Peter Bendix (born c. 1984), American professional baseball executive
 Reinhard Bendix (1916–1991), German-American sociologist
 Rigmor Stampe Bendix (1850–1923), Danish baroness and writer
 Simone Bendix (born 1967), Danish actress
 Victor Bendix (1851–1926), Danish composer
 Vincent Hugo Bendix (1881–1945), American inventor and industrialist
 William Bendix (1906–1964), American film, radio, and television actor

Corporations 
 Bendix Corporation
 Bendix Helicopters

Other 
 Knuth–Bendix completion algorithm
 Bendix G-15 computer
 Bendix affiliation Philco – Thorn EMI major household appliances
 Bendix (automobile), a car manufactured in the early 1900s
 Bendix drive, part of an automobile starter motor
 Bendix Trophy